Senator Dowling may refer to:

Edward J. Dowling (1875–?), New York State Senate
Victor J. Dowling (1866–1934), New York State Senate